The Texas Tech Red Raiders college basketball team competes in the National Collegiate Athletic Association's (NCAA) Division I, representing Texas Tech University in the South Division of the Big 12 Conference. Texas Tech has played its home games at United Spirit Arena in Lubbock, Texas since its opening in 1999.

Texas Tech (then known as Texas Technological College) fielded its first intercollegiate men's basketball team during the 1925–26 season. The school's athletics teams were known as the "Matadors" from 1925 to 1936, to reflect the influence of the Spanish Renaissance architecture on campus. In 1932, Texas Tech was admitted to the Border Intercollegiate Athletic Association, also known as the Border Conference. In the team's first season of conference play, Texas Tech went undefeated, winning the first of three consecutive Border Conference championships. At the beginning of the 1937–38 season, Texas Tech's short-lived Matadors moniker was replaced officially with "Red Raiders", the nickname the team has today. Texas Tech received their first postseason bid in 1942 to the National Association of Intercollegiate Basketball (NAIB) tournament. Before withdrawing from the Border Conference in 1956, the Red Raiders won five conference championships and one co-championship.

In 1957, Texas Tech was admitted to the Southwest Conference (SWC), in which it experienced similar success as it had in the Border Conference. In the regular season, the Red Raiders won four conference championships and three conference co-championships. At the end of the 1976 regular season, the Southwest Conference began an annual conference tournament known as the SWC Classic. Texas Tech won five SWC Classic titles in their six appearances in the conference tournament championship game. The university remained in the SWC until the conference ceased operations in 1996, when the Red Raiders ended the 1995–96 season ranked #8 in both the AP (Associated Press) Poll and Coaches' Poll. Following the dissolution of the SWC, the university became a charter member in the South Division of the Big 12 Conference. Since joining the Big 12 Conference, the Red Raiders did not receive a bid to postseason play until 2002, when Hall of Fame coach Bob Knight was hired. During Knight's six-year tenure, Texas Tech received five postseason bids, participating in four NCAA tournaments and one National Invitation Tournament (NIT). The Red Raiders won the third place playoff in the 2003 NIT tournament, the farthest a Red Raiders basketball team has advanced in postseason play before Chris Beard lead the team to 2019 NCAA Division I Men's Basketball Championship Game.

Seasons

 
 

  Bass resigned after the first 13 games of the 1970–71 season, going 8–5 and 1–0 in conference. Gerald Myers was named interim head coach for final 13 games, going 8–5 and 8–5 in conference.
  Texas Tech vacated its 1996 NCAA tournament appearance due to ineligible players; official record is 28–1.
  Texas Tech forfeited its entire 1996–97 conference slate due to ineligible players, but Dickey was ruled not to have been affected.
  Bob Knight resigned after 20 games, going 12–8 and 3–3 in conference. Pat Knight took over, going 4–7 and 4–6 in conference.

References

External links

Texas Tech Red Raiders
Red Raiders
Texas Tech Red Raiders basketball seasons